Samuel Charles Grashio (April 1, 1918 – October 3, 1999) was a United States Army Air Forces pilot who was captured by the Japanese in World War II. He survived the Bataan Death March and participated in the only successful mass escape from a Japanese prison camp.

Grashio was born and raised in Spokane, Washington. He enlisted in the Army Air Corps in September 1940. After training, he was sent to the Philippines, arriving in Manila on November 20, 1941, to join the 24th Pursuit Group's 21st Pursuit Squadron as a second lieutenant.

World War II
On December 8, the same day as the attack on Pearl Harbor (on the other side of the International Date Line), he flew from Nichols Field to engage in aerial combat against the Japanese in his Curtis P-40E fighter airplane. Along with the rest of the 24th Group, he ended up at Bataan, where he flew the last combat mission on April 8, 1942. The Battle of Bataan ended the next day with an Allied surrender.

Grashio joined the other prisoners of war in the infamous Bataan Death March. He was imprisoned first at Camp O'Donnell, north of Manila. Two months later, he was transferred to a camp at Cabanatuan. Finally, in October, he was among 1000 prisoners judged fit to work; they were moved to a lumber camp on Mindanao (Davao Region) to engage in manual labor.

Grashio and his squadron commander, Lieutenant Ed Dyess, eight other Americans, including Austin Shofner,  and two Filipinos escaped into the jungle on Sunday, April 4, 1943. One of the other Americans was USMC Lt. Jack Hawkins, who had organized the escape. After wandering for three days in the swamp, they contacted a band of Filipino guerrillas. They then joined the Mindanao guerrillas under the command of Lt. Col. Wendell Fertig. Over the course of the next few months, seven of the men were transported a few at a time by submarine to Australia while three stayed behind to continue fighting with the guerrillas. One of these, an Army Air Corps engineering officer named Leo Boelens, was eventually killed by the Japanese.  Grashio and Luis Morgan escaped to Australia via submarine.

Grashio was awarded the Distinguished Service Cross and the Silver Star with cluster during the war.

Later life
He rose to the rank of colonel before retiring in 1965. He then became the assistant to the President of Gonzaga University in Spokane.

He co-authored Return to Freedom: The War Memoirs of Colonel Samuel C. Grashio U.S.A.F. (1982) with Bernard Norling.

Grashio died in 1999. He was survived by his wife Devonia Grashio.
She died in 2015. They had six children: daughters Patricia Ohlidal (deceased), Marilyn (Jim) Cline of Yakima, Judith Dawson, Mary Elizabeth Grashio, Celene (Tony) Riccelli and son Samuel (Laurie) Grashio, all of Spokane.

See also
List of American guerrillas in the Philippines
Ray C. Hunt
Escape From Davao: The Forgotten Story of the Most Daring Prison Break of the Pacific War

References

1999 deaths
American prisoners of war in World War II
Bataan Death March prisoners
Recipients of the Distinguished Service Cross (United States)
Recipients of the Silver Star
United States Army Air Forces pilots of World War II
1918 births
United States Army Air Forces officers
United States Air Force colonels
Military personnel from Spokane, Washington
Aviators from Washington (state)
Gonzaga University faculty